The Market Street Railway Company was a commercial streetcar and bus operator in  San Francisco. The company was named after the famous Market Street of that city, which formed the core of its transportation network. Over the years, the company was also known as the Market Street Railroad Company, the Market Street Cable Railway Company and the United Railroads of San Francisco. Once the largest transit operator in the city, the company folded in 1944 and its assets and services were acquired by the city-owned San Francisco Municipal Railway. Many of the former routes continue to exist into the 2020s, but served by buses.

The company should not be mistaken for the current Market Street Railway, which is named after its predecessor but is actually a legally unconnected non-profit support group for San Francisco's heritage streetcar lines.

History

Horse and steam

The franchise for what would become the Market Street Railway was granted in 1857 to Thomas Hayes. The line was the first horsecar line to open in San Francisco, opened on July 4, 1860, as the Market Street Railroad Company. A few years later, the line was converted to steam power utilizing steam dummy locomotives pulling a trailer car. Four Portland gauge tank locomotives were built by San Francisco's Albion Foundry. Locomotives #2 and #3 were  0-4-0Ts with a baggage compartment. Both types pulled  double-truck trailers with seating for 64 passengers. Baldwin Locomotive Works built two 0-4-0T steam dummies (C/N 5004 & 5009) in 1880 to operate over the standard-gauge railway extension from Valencia Street to Castro Street until 1888.

In 1895 the company placed a newspaper advertisement in The San Francisco Examiner offering horse cars for $20 ($10 without seats). Many of these became the basis for the impromptu community built from streetcars called Carville-by-the-Sea.

Cable

Following the opening of the cable hauled Clay Street Hill Railroad in 1873, pressure grew to convert the city's horsecar lines to the new form of traction. In 1882, Leland Stanford and associates bought the Market Street Railroad Company and converted its lines to cable haulage. In the process, the company's name was changed to the Market Street Cable Railway Company (MSCRy). This company was to grow to become San Francisco's largest cable car operator. At its peak, it operated five lines all of which converged into Market Street to a common terminus at the Ferry Building; during rush hours a cable car left that terminus every 15 seconds. The main line, which began operation from the Ferry Building down Market to Valencia and Twenty-Ninth in August 1883, was joined by four lines that branched off Market by the end of 1888: McAllister, Hayes, Haight, and Castro.

Electric and United Railroads

However transit technology was still moving on, and the new electric streetcar quickly proved to cheaper to build and operate than the cable car, and capable of climbing all but San Francisco's steepest hills. In 1893, Stanford died and the company was taken over by the Southern Pacific Railroad. The company was again renamed to the Market Street Railway Company, and began the process of converting its lines to electric traction. In 1895, MSRy inaugurated service on the Fillmore Counterbalance, which was the steepest rail line to date, operating as a hybrid of counterbalance funicular and electric traction.

In 1902, the Southern Pacific Railroad sold their San Francisco railways to a syndicate of eastern investors, led by Patrick Calhoun, which consolidated with other San Francisco lines into a new company called the United Railroads of San Francisco (URR).

Conversion to electricity was resisted by opponents like Rudolph Spreckels and other property owners who objected to what they saw as ugly overhead lines on the major thoroughfares of the city center. At 5:12 am on April 18, 1906, those objections were swept away as the great San Francisco earthquake struck. The race to rebuild the city allowed the company to replace all but the steepest of its cable car lines with electric streetcar lines.

On May 14, 1906, Supervisors gave United Railroads permission to string overhead trolley wires on Market St. The next day the Examiner accused United Railroads of exploiting the disaster to push through its overhead trolley franchise. United Railroads proceeded to install overhead power on all of its lines. The San Francisco graft trials were a series of attempts from 1905 to 1908 to prosecute both government officials accused of receiving bribes. These included members of the San Francisco Board of Supervisors, San Francisco Mayor Eugene Schmitz, attorneys Abe Ruef and Tirey L. Ford, and the business owners who were paying the bribes.

Consolidation and decline
Over the years many independent lines had been absorbed, including the Clay Street Hill Railroad, the San Francisco and San Mateo Electric Railway, the Presidio & Ferries Railway, and the Ferries and Cliff House Railway. Ironically the earthquake that brought so many benefits to the company also sowed the seeds of its demise, as the independent Geary Street, Park & Ocean Railway was acquired by the city and became in 1912 the beginning of the San Francisco Municipal Railway (Muni). Horsecars were finally withdrawn from city streets on June 3, 1914. By 1918, and assisted by the construction of several tunnels under the city's hills, Muni was in direct competition with the URR down the length of Market Street. The two operators each operated their own pair of rail tracks down that thoroughfare, which came to be known as the 'roar of the four'. The two Market Street Railway tracks were on the inside and the two San Francisco Municipal Railway tracks were on the outside.

Competition, labor troubles and a bad accident in 1918 led to the reorganisation of the URR, to re-emerge again as the Market Street Railway Company. This continued to operate electric streetcars throughout the city, the Powell St. cable car lines, and a growing fleet of buses. But relations were not good with the city, who controlled their franchises, and on May 16, 1944, after defeating the proposal six times previously, voters elected to purchase the operative properties of the Market Street Railway for $7.5 million ($ in  adjusted for inflation) and the company sold all its assets and operations to Muni.

Surviving vehicles 

These are the only surviving vehicles from the Market Street Railway fleet:

Passenger Cars
Car 578 was built in 1896 by the Hammond Car Company and is a single-truck (four-wheel), California car with open end sections and an enclosed middle compartment.  After serving many years as a work car, it was eventually restored to its original form by the Muni, and is still run for special events and charters.
Car 798 was built in the company's own shops in 1924.  This car was sold for scrap after World War II. Used as a residence and jewelry store in the California town of Columbia, it was reacquired in 1984 and is currently undergoing restoration for occasional use on the F Market line.
Car 755 was built in 1895 by the Hammond Car Company and is similar to car 578. It was sold to the Presidio & Ferries Railroad in 1906. In 1913, the Muni acquired the Presidio & Ferries upon the expiration of its operating franchise and the car continue to run in passenger service for the Muni until 1922. At that time it was converted into a work car. It was retired in 1946. It was acquired by private owners in 1947 and stored in Pescadero. It was moved to the Western Railway Museum in 1965 where it awaits restoration.
Car 974 was built in the company's own shops, and was acquired by the Bay Area Electric Railway Association. Unfortunately, it was burned while in storage in Stockton before the formation of the Western Railway Museum.
Parlor car "San Francisco" was built in 1901 by the St. Louis Car company as San Francisco & San Mateo 61. It was rebuilt by the United Railroads of San Francisco as parlor car available for rent named "San Francisco." In the 1920s the luxury charter business became unprofitable due to competing tour buses and automobiles and the car was converted into a school car for transporting students anywhere on the system free of charge. This came to an end due to World War II and the car was used for minimal charter service by the San Francisco Municipal Railway in 1944. It was sold for scrap in 1951 and became a hot dog stand in the Valley of the Moon. It was eventually required by the San Francisco Maritime Museum for a failed museum and donated to the Western Railway Museum in 1980.

Maintenance Equipment
Car 0109 was built in 1891 by O'Brian and Sons in 1890 as a passenger streetcar with combination open and closed configuration similar to a Powell Street cable car for the Metropolitan Railway. In 1894 the Metropolitan Railway was acquired by the Market Street Railway. In 1900 the car was rebuilt into a motorized side dump car by WL Holman Car Company for the Market Street Railway. It was later rebuilt as a rail grinder in 1912. It became the property of the San Francisco Municipal Railway in 1944 and served as their grinder until being put on temporary loan to the Western Railway Museum in the 1970s. It was formally acquired by the Western Railway Museum in 2019.
Car 0130 was built as an electric crane in the United Railroad of San Francisco's shops in 1904. It became Market Street Railway 0130 in 1921 and San Francisco Municipal Railway 0130 in 1944. In 1973 it was acquired by Western Railway Museum.
Car 0304 was built by Hammond as a double-truck California car for passenger service on the San Francisco & San Mateo Electric Railway in 1900. It became United Railroads of San Francisco 673 in 1902 and was rebuilt into wrecker 0673 in 1907. It was rebuilt into United Railroads of San Francisco overhead lines maintenance car 0304 in 1910. In 1921 it became Market Street Railway 0304 and San Francisco Municipal Railway 0304 in 1944. It is still on Muni property.

Routes
The last of the company's streetcar routes were discontinued or converted to bus or trolleybus by 1949. Two of the former cable lines were integrated into the current San Francisco cable car system. The company operated the following routes:

See also
San Francisco cable car system
San Francisco Railway Museum
San Francisco Municipal Railway
Market Street Railway (nonprofit)
San Francisco Municipal Railway fleet

References

Bibliography

Further reading
 Smallwood, Charles A. (1978). The White Front Cars of San Francisco (Interurban Special #44). Glendale, California: Interurban Press. —a complete history of the Market Street Railway company with numerous photos, illustrations and maps

1857 establishments in California
1944 disestablishments in California
Cable car railways in the United States
Companies based in San Francisco
Defunct California railroads
Defunct companies based in the San Francisco Bay Area
Defunct public transport operators in the United States
History of San Francisco
Interurban railways in California
Market Street (San Francisco)
Public transportation in San Francisco
San Francisco Municipal Railway
South of Market, San Francisco
Streetcars in California
Tram, urban railway and trolley companies